Lyonsia taiwanica is a bivalve within the family Lyonsiidae. 

Lyonsia taiwanica was described by Lan and Okutani in 2002, from a sample near Tainan. It lives in mangroves.

References

Lyonsiidae
Molluscs described in 2002
Marine molluscs of Asia
Bivalves of Asia
Invertebrates of Taiwan